The Oxybii or Oxubii were a Celto-Ligurian tribe dwelling on the Mediterranean coast during the Iron Age and the Roman period.

Name 

They are mentioned as Oxubíōn (Ὀξυβίων) by Polybius (2nd c. BC) and Strabo (early 1st c. AD), and as Oxubi by Pliny (1st c. AD).

Patrizia de Bernardo Stempel has proposed to interpret the ethnic name Oxubii as 'the inhabitants of a high place' or else as 'the ox-slayers', from the Celtic stem oxso- ('ox') or uxso- ('high'). According to her, such linguistically Celtic tribal names suggest that a Celto-Ligurian dialect played an important role among the languages spoken in ancient Ligury.

Geography 
The Oxybii dwelled on the Mediterranean coast. Their territory was located east of the Suelteri and Verucini, and either east of the Deciates (near the Vediantii) or west of them (near the river Argens in the Massif de l'Esterel).

The exact location of the sea-port of the Oxybii, named Aegitna and located west of the river Apro, has been debated. The most popular propositions are Théoule (with the river Siagne), west of the Deciates, and Cagnes (with the river Cagne), east of the Deciates.

According to historian Guy Barruol, the Oxybii were part of the Saluvian confederation.

History 
In 155 BC, the Ligurians besieged the Massaliote colonies of Nicaea (Nice) and Antipolis (Antibes), which caused the Romans to send the legates Flaminius, Popilius Laenas and Lucius Pupius to the region. The Oxybii tried to prevent them from landing in their territory at Aegitna, but finding that Flaminius had already done so, they wounded him, killed two of his servants and drove the rest back into the sea. The Roman Senate, on hearing of the incident, dispatched an army under the consul Quintus Opimius. They first took Aegitna by assault, sold the inhabitants into slavery and sent the ringleaders to Rome. The Oxybii then collected a force to attack the Romans, and were eventually joined by the Deciates. After the Ligurian defeat, Quintus Opimius granted a great part of their territory to Massalia.

References

Primary sources

Bibliography

Further reading
Cosson, Pierre (1995) Civitas Antipolitana: Histoire du Municipe Romain d'Antipolis. Nice, Serre Editeur. 

Ligures